4A Games Limited is a Ukrainian-Maltese video game developer based in Sliema, Malta. The company was founded in Kyiv, Ukraine, in 2006 by three developers who departed from GSC Game World. In 2014, 4A Games moved its headquarters to Sliema, wherein the Kyiv office was retained as a sub-studio. The company is best known for developing the Metro video game series.

History

Foundation 
4A Games was founded by former developers from GSC Game World: Andrew Prokhorov, Oles Shyshkovtsov, and Alexander Maximchuk; they, together with Sergei Karmalsky, formed the core team of S.T.A.L.K.E.R.: Shadow of Chernobyl, which was in development at GSC in the early and mid-2000s. Prokhorov had disliked that Sergiy Grygorovych, the chief executive officer (CEO) of GSC, prioritized money over his employees, withholding royalties for games the company had produced. The situation came to a high point when the two fell out over wages in 2006, leading Prokhorov and two of the company's lead programmers—Shyshkovtsov and Maximchuk—to leave the company and found a new studio, 4A Games, with the intention to treat its employees better than Grygorovych did.

Metro series 
The company's first game was Metro 2033, an adaptation of the novel of the same name by Russian author Dmitry Glukhovsky that was announced in 2009. The game was released in March 2010 on the Xbox 360 and Microsoft Windows to generally favorable reviews.

Following their initial success, 4A Games began work on the sequel, Metro: Last Light, which was announced during the 2011 Electronic Entertainment Expo convention. The game faced several issues during its production, whose release date was delayed from 2012 to 2013. The most significant setback for the company occurred in January 2013, when the game's publisher, THQ, closed down after declaring bankruptcy and auctioning off its intellectual properties. The publishing rights to the Metro 2033 franchise, including the sequel, were sold to Koch Media for $5.8 million on 22 January, allowing the company to finish making the game. Metro: Last Light was finally released on 14 May 2013, and was published by Koch Media's video game label, Deep Silver.

On 30 March 2014, a remastered re-release of both Metro titles, under the name Metro Redux, was leaked, and confirmed the day after. The compilation was released in August 2014 for eighth-generation platforms. In 2017, the company released a virtual reality game, Arktika.1.

During the 2017 E3 convention, at the Microsoft press conference on 11 June 2017, a new game, Metro Exodus, was announced for a 2018 release. Gameplay was shown to both announce the game and act as a graphical showcase for Microsoft's native 4K-focused update to the Xbox One hardware, Xbox One X. The game was released in 2019.

Expansion 
On 12 May 2014, amidst the Ukrainian crisis and following the annexation of Crimea by the Russian Federation, 4A Games announced that they were to expand by opening a new studio in and moving their headquarters to Sliema, Malta to allow for easier operations inside the European Union, with the Kyiv studio continuing to operate for Eastern European operations.

The publisher of the Metro series, Deep Silver, was already a part of the Embracer Group via Koch Media, making the acquisition a sensible one for both groups.

Prior to the 2022 Russian invasion of Ukraine in February 2022, Saber Interactive stated that all employees at 4A's Kyiv studio can relocate to other Saber-owned companies abroad if they choose to. Like other Ukrainian video game studios, it became involved in the campaign to organize funds and support for Ukraine.

Games developed

Notes

References

External links 
 

Saber Interactive
Ukrainian companies established in 2006
Sliema
Video game companies established in 2006
Video game companies of Malta
Video game companies of Ukraine
Video game development companies
2020 mergers and acquisitions